William Graydon may refer to:

 William Edward Graydon or 220 Kid (born 1989), English record producer and DJ
 William Murray Graydon (1864–1946), American writer

See also
 Graydon (disambiguation)
 Graydon (name)